Ping An Insurance known also as Ping An of China, full name Ping An Insurance (Group) Company of China, Ltd. is a Chinese holding conglomerate whose subsidiaries provide insurance, banking, asset management, financial, healthcare services. The company was founded in 1988 and is headquartered in Shenzhen. "Ping An" literally means "safe and well".

In 2022, Ping An ranked 17th on the Forbes Global 2000 list and 25th on the Fortune Global 500 list. Ping An ranked 21st among the World’s top 500 Most Valuable Brands and fourth among global financial enterprises in the Global 500 2022 Report by Brand Finance.

The company is considered to be the world's largest insurer, with US$121.7 billion net premiums written in 2020. Its market capitalization was US$136 billion in March 2021, making it the largest insurer in the Asia-Pacific region.

Ping An Insurance is one of the top 50 companies in the Shanghai Stock Exchange. It is also a constituent stock of Hang Seng Index, an index of the top 50 companies in the Hong Kong Stock Exchange. Ping An Insurance was also included in the pan-China stock indices CSI 300 Index, FTSE China A50 Index and Hang Seng China 50 Index. 

Ping An is a signatory of the United Nations-supported Principles for Responsible Investment (PRI), and was the first asset owner in mainland China to join.

Business
Ping An Insurance Group started off in 1988 as a property and casualty insurance company, later diversifying into insurance, banking, asset management, financial services and healthcare services.

Ping An has licenses to offer financial services, including insurance, banking, trusts, securities, futures and financial leasing.

Since the mid-1990s, Ping An has been subsequently taken investments from overseas firms such as Morgan Stanley and Goldman Sachs in 1994. In 2002 HSBC took a large equity interest in Ping An. In early 2008, Ping An agreed to take a 50% share in Fortis Investments, a subsidiary of Fortis, which had taken over ABN AMRO Asset Management as a result of the split up of ABN AMRO in late 2007; the deal was canceled in October 2008.

In June 2009, Ping An became a strategic investor in Shenzhen Development Bank, (now part of Ping An Bank).

In 2016, Ping An Healthcare and Technology (Ping An Good Doctor) completed a Series A funding round of a total of US$500 million, making its valuation hit US$3 billion. Ping An also bought a 48% stake in Chinese car website Autohome Inc. from Telstra Corp. for $1.6 billion.

In February 2018, three technology subsidiaries of Ping An completed private placement financing, which received positive responses particularly from international institutional investors. They were Ping An Healthcare and Technology Company Limited, Ping An Medical and Healthcare Management Co., Ltd and OneConnect Financial Technology Co., LTD.

In May 2018, Ping An Good Doctor was listed on the Hong Kong Stock Exchange.

In June 2019, Ping An One Connect Bank officially commenced operation after receiving a virtual banking license from the Hong Kong Monetary Authority in May 2019. In December 2019, OneConnect Financial Technology was listed on the New York Stock Exchange.

In October 2020, Lufax, one of China's leading online wealth management platform, listed on the New York Stock Exchange. 

Over the years, Ping An has launched fintech and healthcare businesses such as Lufax Holding, OneConnect, Ping An Good Doctor (1833.HK), and Ping An HealthKonnect. 

Brand Finance ranked Ping An Insurance as one of the top global insurance brands, and as of 2021, the most valuable global financial brand in the world.

In January 2022, Ping An Life received approval from the CBIRC for its investment in New Founder Group.

In March 2022, Ping An Life launched a home care service for the elderly.

Technology-Powered Business Transformation

Ping An invests 1% of its revenues into R&D (which itself consists of 10% of its annual profits), specifically, on new technologies of AI, Blockchain and Cloud Computing for ten years to transform its financial services and support the building of its five ecosystems: financial services, healthcare, auto services, real estate services, and smart city services.

More than 598 million users are connected to at least one of those ecosystems.

Over the years, Ping An has successfully launched fintech and healthtech businesses such as Lufax Holding, OneConnect, Ping An Good Doctor (1833.HK), and Ping An HealthKonnect. 

Ping An's AskBob Doctor has ranked first in one of the three tasks in MEDIQA 2021, an AI healthcare questionand- answer contest hosted by the Association for Computational Linguistics. In 2021, AskBob Doctor scored an average 92.4 points while the six endocrinologists human team scored 89.5 points in an International Human-Machine Competition on Diabetes Management.

In August 2022, Ping An launched an earth observation optical remote sensing satellite, PinAn-3 which also called Taijing-1 01.

Ownership
Ping An is a publicly listed company.

As of 31 December 2021, the Thai-based Charoen Pokphand Group is the single largest shareholder in Ping An, holding a 6.8% stake. The Shenzhen government, via Shenzhen Investment Holdings, owns a 5.27% stake as the second largest shareholder.

Ping An has the classification of a civilian-run enterprise. Richard McGregor, author of The Party: The Secret World of China's Communist Rulers, said that "the true ownership of large chunks of its shares remains unclear" and that the ownership of Ping An is a "murky structure". In October 2012, The New York Times reported that relatives and associates of Chinese Premier Wen Jiabao controlled stakes in Ping An worth at least US$2.2 billion in 2007.

HSBC acquired 48.22% of H shares by means of different HSBC subsidiaries (H shares accounted for 34.83% of the share capital as at 31 December 2009, which was later increased to 41.88% in 2015). HSBC holds 16.80% of total shares of Ping An, making it the biggest shareholder as of 31 December 2009.

Markets

Since 24 June 2004 Ping An has been listed on the Stock Exchange of Hong Kong (subsidiary of Hong Kong Exchanges and Clearing) as SEHK: 2318. Since 1 March 2007, it has a listing on the Shanghai Stock Exchange as SSE: 601318.

Ping An replaced Anhui Expressway in the Hang Seng China Enterprises Index (HSCEI) in 2004.  

The Hang Seng Index Services Company announced on 11 May 2007, that Ping An would join as Hang Seng Index Constituent Stock effective on 4 June 2007.

Operations

Ping An has operations across all of the People's Republic of China, and in Hong Kong and Macau through Ping An Insurance Overseas. Lufax, OneConnect and Ping An Good Doctor have now expanded overseas. OneConnect served 100+ customers in 20 countries and regions mainly in Southeast Asia.

ESG

The financial group is the first Chinese asset owner to have signed Climate Action 100+ and the United Nations’ Principle of Responsible Investment (UNPRI). PRI chief Reynolds called Ping An's decision "a milestone on China's road toward the full embrace of ESG".

Ping An has invested more than USD$140 billion in clean energy and affordable healthcare. It has extended credit lines of more than USD$8.5 billion towards companies with green initiatives, with a balance of loans at the end of 2019 exceeding USD$3.4 billion. It was the first Chinese company to join UN Principles for Sustainable Insurance.

It was the first insurance company from mainland China to be selected for the 2019 Dow Jones Sustainability Emerging Markets Index (DJSI).

Ping An was named ESG Investor of the Year for Insurers, China at The Triple A Sustainable Investing Awards for Institutional Investor, ETF, and Asset Servicing Providers by The Asset Magazine.

Ping An Insurance (Group) Co. of China Ltd. target to achieve operational carbon neutrality in 2030. And promised to support China's goal of achieving carbon neutrality by 2060, on the 52nd annual Earth Day. Ping An Insurance Group published its green finance strategy in their 2020 Climate Risk Management Report.

In July 2022, Ping An shown to support the floods in Henan by launching contingency measures after the unrivalled rainstorm hit Central China's Henan province.

In 2022, The China Enterprise Reform and Development Society released the first China-focused ESG disclosure standard which collaborated with Ping An and dozens of other companies in China. Ping An drafted the standard by incorporating the insurer’s in-house CN-ESG evaluation system framework to provide a standardised scientific approach for corporate ESG information disclosure. Ping An Insurance Group published its green finance strategy in their 2020 Climate Risk Management Report.

A global leading ESG rating firm, Sustainalytics, rated Ping An as low ESG risk and score of 18.3. This was the best score among 290 Mainland China's insurance companies.

Ping An was recognized in The S&P Global Sustainability Yearbook 2022 , the world’s most comprehensive publication of its kind, for its commitment to progress in sustainability by scoring within the top 15% of the insurance industry and achieving an S&P Global ESG Score within 30% of the industry’s top-performing company.

See also
 Ping An Bank

Notes

External links 
 
 News website about Ping An systems upgrade 

 
Financial services companies established in 1988
Companies listed on the Hong Kong Stock Exchange
Companies listed on the Shanghai Stock Exchange
Companies in the CSI 100 Index
Financial services companies of China
Companies in the Hang Seng Index
H shares
Companies based in Shenzhen
Insurance companies of China
Chinese companies established in 1988
Chinese brands
Charoen Pokphand
Multinational companies headquartered in China
Civilian-run enterprises of China